The 2003 Croatian Cup Final was a two-legged affair played between Uljanik Pula and Hajduk Split. 
The first leg was played in Pula on 21 May 2003, while the second leg on 4 June 2003 in Split.

Hajduk Split won the trophy with an aggregate result of 5–0.

Road to the final

First leg

Second leg

External links
Official website 

2003 Final
HNK Hajduk Split matches
Cup Final